James D. George (born June 1, 1935) is a retired American weightlifter. He competed at the 1956 and 1960 Olympics and won a bronze and a silver medal, respectively.

George is the son of Bulgarian immigrants from Macedonia. His elder brother, Pete George, is also a retired Olympic weightlifter. Jim was a four-time AAU champion and the 1959 Pan American champion in the light-heavyweight division. He also won four medals at the world championships (1955–1959) and set two world record (1956), in the snatch and clean and jerk.

References

1935 births
Living people
Sportspeople from Akron, Ohio
American people of Bulgarian descent
American male weightlifters
Weightlifters at the 1956 Summer Olympics
Weightlifters at the 1960 Summer Olympics
Olympic silver medalists for the United States in weightlifting
Olympic bronze medalists for the United States in weightlifting
Medalists at the 1960 Summer Olympics
Medalists at the 1956 Summer Olympics
Pan American Games gold medalists for the United States
Pan American Games medalists in weightlifting
Weightlifters at the 1959 Pan American Games
World Weightlifting Championships medalists
Medalists at the 1959 Pan American Games
20th-century American people
21st-century American people